John Swan (1787–1869) was an engineer who worked for the shipbuilder Charles Gordon & Co. in Deptford.  In 1824, he demonstrated the efficacy of the screw propeller using a model boat on a pond in the grounds of Mr Gordon's house in Dulwich.  Others present included Captain Forbes of the Royal Navy and Dr. George Birkbeck, who wrote in praise of the invention in The Mechanics' Register, 

Swan is buried in Abney Park Cemetery and his memorial is listed for preservation as Grade II. His inscription reads:

References

1787 births
1869 deaths
British marine engineers
Engineers from London